Sian or Siyan may refer to:


People
Siân, a Welsh girl's name; list of people with this name

Places
Sian, Iran (disambiguation), various places in Iran
Sian, Russia, a rural locality in Amur Oblast, Russia
Xi'an, China, formerly romanized as Sian

Other uses
 Sian (band), Scottish traditional music band
 Sian (crater), a crater on Mars
 Sian language, a Kajang language of Brunei and Sarawak
 Lamborghini Sián FKP 37, a hybrid sports car launched in 2019
 SIANspheric, Canadian band formerly named Sian
 Stop the Islamisation of Norway (SIAN), a Norwegian anti-Islam group which was established in 2008
 Siyan, a Kurdish tribe

See also
Sain (disambiguation)
Sihan language, a Papuan language of Papua New Guinea
Syan language, a Bantu language spoken in East Africa
Syan (disambiguation)
Sayan (disambiguation)